is a Japanese football player. He plays for Omiya Ardija on loan from FC Tokyo.

Career
Masayuki Yamada joined FC Tokyo in 2016. On march 20, he debuted in J3 League (v FC Ryukyu).

Club statistics
Updated to 14 February 2020.

References

External links
Profile at FC Tokyo

1994 births
Living people
Hosei University alumni
Association football people from Saitama Prefecture
Japanese footballers
J1 League players
J2 League players
J3 League players
FC Tokyo players
FC Tokyo U-23 players
FC Machida Zelvia players
Avispa Fukuoka players
Zweigen Kanazawa players
Omiya Ardija players
Association football defenders